Alpha 2 is a science fiction anthology edited by Robert Silverberg, first published as a paperback original by Ballantine Books in November 1977. No further editions have been issued.
.

Contents
Introduction by Robert Silverberg
"Call Me Joe" by Poul Anderson (Astounding 1957)
"Goodbye Amanda Jean" by Wilma Shore (Galaxy 1970)
"A Man of the Renaissance" by Wyman Guin (Galaxy 1964)
"Wall of Crystal, Eye of Night" by Algis Budrys (Galaxy 1961)
"Faith of Our Fathers" by Philip K. Dick (Dangerous Visions 1967) 
"That Share of Glory" by C. M. Kornbluth (Astounding 1952)
"The Men Return" by Jack Vance (Infinity 1957)
"The Voices of Time" by J. G. Ballard (New Worlds 1960)
"The Burning of the Brain" by Cordwainer Smith (If 1958)
"The Shaker Revival" by Gerald Jonas (Galaxy 1970)

"Faith of Our Fathers" was nominated for the 1968 Hugo Award for Best Novelette.

Reception
Writing in The New York Times Book Review, Theodore Sturgeon praised the anthology, saying that "Robert Silverberg, who knows good story‐telling and good writing because that's what he does, uses these criteria in his selections for his Alpha series". Sturgeon also praised Alpha 2 in Galaxy, describing it as "ten fine stories and a Best Buy". Amazing Stories lauded Alpha 2 as "as strong an entry as its predecessor. . . .  [T]he level of writing is high, the visions uncommonly clear, and the book, ultimately, entertaining".

Awards
It placed sixth in the reprint anthology/collection category in the 1972 Locus Poll.

References

External links
 Goodreads listing for Alpha 2
 MIT Science Fiction Society's Library Pinkdex Entry for Alpha2

1971 anthologies
Science fiction anthologies
Robert Silverberg anthologies
Ballantine Books books
1970s science fiction works